Giuseppe Marri (1788–1852) was an Italian engraver.

He initially attended the Faentine School of Design under Zauli, and alongside Tommaso Minardi and Michele Sangiorgi. He was then sponsored by the Faentine Congregation of Charity, to travel to Rome to apprentice as an engraver. In 1818 he moved to Milan to work under the engraver Giuseppe Longhi. In 1830, he returned to his native Faenza, to direct the School of Design, now directed by Saviotti, and renamed the School of Drawing and Engraving. In 1849 he accepted a similar position in the city of Forlì.

References

1788 births
1852 deaths
18th-century Italian painters
Italian male painters
19th-century Italian painters
Italian engravers
19th-century Italian male artists
18th-century Italian male artists